Conspiracy of the Borgias (Italian: La congiura dei Borgia) is a 1959 Italian historical drama film directed by Antonio Racioppi and starring Frank Latimore, Constance Smith and Gisèle Gallois.

Cast
 Frank Latimore as Guido di Belmonte  
 Constance Smith as Lucrezia Borgia
 Gisèle Gallois as Simonetta di Rovena  
 Alberto Farnese as Enzo de Rovena  
 José Jaspe as Falconetto  
 Valeria Fabrizi 
 Flora Carosello 
 Tommaso Gizzi 
 Gino Buzzanca 
 Andrea Fantasia 
 Gildo Bocci 
 Nino Musco 
 Nino Marchesini 
 Carla Strober 
 Giorgio Costantini

References

Bibliography
 James Robert Parish & Kingsley Canham. Film directors guide--Western Europe. Scarecrow Press, 1976.

External links

1959 films
Italian historical drama films
1950s historical drama films
1950s Italian-language films
Films directed by Antonio Racioppi
Films set in the 16th century
1959 drama films
Cultural depictions of Lucrezia Borgia
1950s Italian films